Gregory John Rogers (19 June 1957 – 1 May 2013) was an illustrator and writer of children's books, especially picture books. He was the first Australian to win the annual Kate Greenaway Medal from the Library Association, recognising the year's best children's book illustration by a British subject. The book was Way Home by the Australian writer Libby Hathorn, published in the U.K. by Andersen Press in 1994. In the unnamed city, a boy makes his way home at night and adopts a stray cat en route. The "picture book for older readers" was controversial on grounds both that it was "hardboiled" and that it "romanticised the plight of the homeless".

Life and career

Rogers was born on 19 June 1957, in Brisbane to Marie Bohlscheid and Rex Rogers and grew up in Coorparoo. He studied at the Queensland College of Art (fine art) and worked as a graphic designer before taking up freelance illustration in 1987.

Rogers has illustrated many books including Margaret Card's Aunty Mary's Dead Goat, Ian Trevaskis's The Postman Race, Gary Crew's Tracks and Lucy's Bay, Libby Hathorn's Way Home, and Nigel Gray's Running Away From Home. Beside the Greenaway Medal, Way Home also won a Parents' Choice Award in the U.S. and was shortlisted for the APBA book design awards.

Nevertheless, his most widely held work in WorldCat participating libraries is the first book he both wrote and illustrated, The Boy, the Bear, the Baron, and the Bard. The picture book was published by Allen & Unwin of Australia in 2004 and by Roaring Brook Press that same year in the U.S.
It features a timeslip to Shakespeare's London by a boy who follows a soccer ball from Shakespeare's Globe, the modern reconstruction, to the original Globe Theatre.
With Midsummer Knight (2006) and The Hero of Little Street (2009) it constitutes a "wordless picture book series" that Publishers Weekly calls his work best known in the U.S.

Rogers played several musical instruments—the cornetto, recorder, and the baroque guitar—performing music of the 16th and 17th centuries. He collected "CDs, antiques, books, and anything that might attract dust". He was also an avid collector of Art Deco items.

Rogers died 1 May 2013 in Brisbane from stomach cancer.

Books

Solo works
According to Publishers Weekly, Rogers was "best known in [the U.S.] for his sequence of three wordless picture books".
 The Boy, The Bear, The Baron, The Bard (Crows Nest, New South Wales: Allen & Unwin, 2004)
 Midsummer Knight (2006)
 The Hero of Little Street (2009)
 Omar the Strongman, text and illustrations (Scholastic Press, 2013),

As illustrator

 Enter Bob Dickinson (1988) by Kay Arthur
 Grandma's Memories (1989) by Virginia King
 Zoe At The Fancy Dress Ball (1990) by Susan Reid
 Lucy Meets A Dragon (1990) by Susan Reid
 Aunty Mary's Dead Goat (1990) by Margaret Card
 The Postman's Race (1991) by Ian Trevaskis
 Space Travellers (1992) by Margaret Wild
 Tracks (1992) by Gary Crew
 Lucy's Bay (1992) by Gary Crew
 Great Grandpa (1994) by Susan McQuade
 Way Home (Andersen, 1994) by Libby Hathorn
 The Bent-Back Bridge (1995) by Gary Crew
 Running Away From Home (1996) by Nigel Gray
 The Island (1996) by Michael O'Hara
 What Goes With Toes? (1996) by Jeri Kroll
 Beyond The Dusk (2000) by Victor Kelleher
 The Platypus (2000) by Jo Brice
 The Gift (2000) by Libby Hathorn
 Princess Max (2001) by Laurie Stiller
 The Rainbow (2001) by Gary Crew
 Theseus and the Minotaur (2002) by Janeen Brian
 Tiddalick the Thirsty Frog (2003) by Mark Carthew
 The Brothers Grim (2004) by Janeen Brian
 It's True! Fashion Can Be Fatal (2004) by Susan Green
 Flitterwig (2009) by Edrei Cullen
 Clearheart (2009) by Edrei Cullen
 Scatterbungle (2011) by Edrei Cullen

See also

References

External links
 
  —immediately, first edition with library catalogue summary
 Gregory Rogers at AUSTLIT
 

Australian children's writers
Australian children's book illustrators
Kate Greenaway Medal winners
1957 births
2013 deaths
People from Brisbane